Short Pine National Forest was established as the Short Pine Forest Reserve in South Dakota on July 22, 1905, with . It became Short Pine National Forest on March 4, 1907.

On July 1, 1908, Short Pine National Forest along with Ekalaka National Forest and Long Pine National Forest in southeastern Montana (the latter two comprising ), as well as Cave Hills National Forest and Slim Buttes National Forest in northwestern South Dakota ( total), were consolidated to form Sioux National Forest.

On January 13, 1920, Sioux National Forest was transferred to Custer National Forest, and in 2014, Custer National Forest merged with Gallatin National Forest.  Following this merger, all land units formerly comprising Sioux National Forest, including the former Short Pine National Forest, are now under the jurisdiction of the Sioux Ranger District of the Custer Gallatin National Forest.

Today, the former Short Pine National Forest consists of the East Short Pine Hills (southwest of Buffalo, South Dakota) and the West Short Pine Hills (south of Camp Crook, South Dakota), both within the Custer Gallatin National Forest Sioux Ranger District.

References

External links
Forest History Society
Custer Gallatin National Forest

Former National Forests of South Dakota
Geography of Harding County, South Dakota